CBM Star of Hope Hospital is a participating hospital of Council of Christian Hospitals, an autonomous body founded to manage medical institutions founded by Canadian Baptist Ministries.  CBM Star of Hope Hospital is located in Akiveedu, West Godavari District, Andhra Pradesh, India.

CBM Star of Hope Hospital was founded by Canadian Baptist Mission in 1898 due to initiative of pioneer medical missionaries.  Church historian, William Gordon Carder, formerly Professor of Church History at Andhra Christian Theological College, Hyderabad, in Hand to the Indian Plow published in 1976 wrote,

CBM Star of Hope Hospital is a member of:
 Council of Christian Hospitals, Pithapuram
 Christian Medical Association of India, New Delhi

Hospital also networks with the Christian Medical College, Vellore

References

Further reading
 
 
  II
 
 
 

Medical Council of India
Hospitals in Andhra Pradesh
Christian hospitals
Buildings and structures in West Godavari district
Canadian Baptist Ministries
1989 establishments in Andhra Pradesh
Hospitals established in 1898